Smuggler is a 1996 Indian Hindi-language action crime film directed by Ajay Kashyap and produced by B. S. Shaad, starring Dharmendra, Ayub Khan, Kareena Grover and Amrish Puri.

Cast
Dharmendra as Ajit Singh
Ayub Khan as Inspector Vijay
Kareena Grover as Karina
Ravinder Maan as Taara
Gugu Gill as Deva
Paramveer Singh as Aman
Amrish Puri as Ratan / Big Man
Reena Roy as Usha
Mukesh Khanna as School Principal
Vishwajeet Pradhan as Big Man's gang member
Upasna Singh as Pooja
Tiku Talsania as Policeman Mathur
Gopi Bhalla as Barman

Soundtrack

 "Aaj Raat Chhodke" (Male) - Kumar Sanu
 "Aaj Raat Chhodke" (Female) - Alka Yagnik
 "Yeh Baarish Ka Pani" - Kumar Sanu, Alka Yagnik
 "Ab Tum Se Chhup Chhup" - Udit Narayan, Kavita Krishnamurthy
 "Bin Barsaat Ke" - Alka Yagnik, Ila Arun
 "Kitna Haseen Hai Shabaab" - Alka Yagnik
 "Kitna Haseen Hai Shabaab" - Sudesh Bhosle, Alka Yagnik
 "Tan Tana Tan Ho Gaya" - Baba Sehgal, Sapna Mukherjee

References

External links
 

1996 films
1990s Hindi-language films
Films scored by Bappi Lahiri